Division No. 7, Subdivision M is an unorganised subdivision in eastern Newfoundland, Newfoundland and Labrador, Canada. It is in Division No. 7 on Trinity Bay.

According to the 2016 Statistics Canada Census:
Population: 1,966
% Change (2011-2016): -4.3
Dwellings: 1,183
Area (km2.): 454.42
Density (persons per km2.): 4.3

Geography of Newfoundland and Labrador
Newfoundland and Labrador subdivisions